Daniel Hrapmann (born April 21, 1989) is a former American football placekicker. He played for Southern Miss from 2010 to 2012. He went on to played pre-season with the Miami Dolphins, two pre-seasons with the Arizona Cardinals  and two with the Pittsburgh Steelers.

Hrapmann is a native of New Orleans, LA, where he attended and graduated from the Holy Cross school for boys, eventually transferring to Southern Miss from the Southeastern Louisiana University in 2008.
 
During college, Daniel was awarded the Walter Camp all American award, the All Conference award as-well as a Lou Graza Award Finalist, in the year 2010.

Professional career

Pittsburgh Steelers
On May 17, 2012, Hrapmann was signed as an undrafted free agent for the Pittsburgh Steelers. On August 27, 2012, he was waived along with 14 others. He was signed to the Reserve/Future squad on January 11, 2013. On August 16, 2013, he was waived by the Steelers.

Miami Dolphins
Hrapmann was signed by the Miami Dolphins during the 2014 offseason, but was waived on August 15, 2014 after the team signed John Potter.

External links
NFL bio
ESPN NFL bio
ESPN College bio

1989 births
Living people
Southern Miss Golden Eagles football players
New Orleans VooDoo players
Arizona Cardinals players
Players of American football from New Orleans
Holy Cross High School, New Orleans alumni
Southeastern Louisiana Lions football players